Walter Parker may refer to:

 Walter Richard Parker (1881–1931), English infantryman, recipient of the Victoria Cross
 Walter Parker (Australian soldier) (1894–2000), Australian centenarian, one of the last three living ANZAC veterans of World War I
 Walter B. Parker (1926–2014),  American policy and transportation official in Alaska